"You're the One" is a song written by Bob Morrison, and recorded by American country music group The Oak Ridge Boys.  It was released in December 1977 as the second single from the album Y'all Come Back Saloon.  The song reached #2 on the Billboard Hot Country Singles & Tracks chart.

Charts

Weekly charts

Year-end charts

Other versions
Glen Campbell originally recorded the song on his 1973 album I Knew Jesus (Before He Was a Star), which influenced the Oak Ridge Boys' rendition. The song was adapted twice—once by Hovie Lister and the Statesmen Quartet in 1974 with gospel-themed verses, and by the American Broadcasting Company in 1978 into their "We're The One" advertising campaign with a more 70's pop style, frequently featuring their network stars lip-syncing the song.

References

1977 singles
Glen Campbell songs
The Oak Ridge Boys songs
Song recordings produced by Ron Chancey
MCA Records singles
1973 songs
Songs written by Bob Morrison (songwriter)